The Church Nuestra Señora de la Asunción (Spanish: Iglesia Nuestra Señora de la Asunción de Cayey) is a Roman Catholic parish church located at the Plaza Ramón Frade square (plaza pública) of downtown Cayey in the municipality of Cayey, Puerto Rico. The church was designed by engineer José Canovas and was built in 1815, with modifications being made in 1889. It was added to the United States National Register of Historic Places on December 10, 1984.

Archaeological findings in 2016 uncovered the original church walls and, in 2019, more than 300 bone remains from the 17th and 19th centuries were found during renovations to the town plaza of Cayey. These are preserved and can be seen at the square in front of the church.

See also 
 National Register of Historic Places listings in central Puerto Rico

References 

Churches on the National Register of Historic Places in Puerto Rico
Tourist attractions in Puerto Rico
1815 establishments in Puerto Rico
Roman Catholic churches in Puerto Rico
National Register of Historic Places in Cayey, Puerto Rico
Roman Catholic churches completed in 1815